R.K. Khandal  प्रो.(डॉ.)आर. के. खाण्डल (born 6 September 1957) is a fellow of the Royal Society of Chemistry, London and Former Vice – Chancellor of Uttar Pradesh Technical University  since 19 September 2012 to May 2015.

Khandal was also the President (for the period 2010 to 2012) of the World Association of Industrial & Technological Organizations (WAITRO).

Early life
Khandal was born in the village Jonaicha Kalan in district Alwar, India,  He completed his education up to eighth standard in the village school, and studied for his higher secondary education at a Govt. school in Delhi followed by further higher studies (graduation and post graduation) from the  Hindu College of the University of Delhi and  received a Doctorate degree in Applied Chemistry from the  Indian School of Mines, Dhanbad.

Academics
 FRSC - Fellow of Royal Society of Chemistry (FRSC), United Kingdom
 Ph.D. (Applied Chemistry), Indian School of Mines, Dhanbad
 M.Sc. (Chemistry), University of Delhi, India

Legacy
Khandal is known for the conversion of ideas from lab scale to commercial scale. He is well known for his expertise in various branches of the chemical sciences leading several groups of scientists pursuing research in various areas of science and technologies.

Awards
 Foundation Day IIC (Northern Regional Centre): R.K. Khandal Awarded By Ex. Prez Pranav Mukherjee

Books edited
 Radiation Processing Technology Applications: Volume I, An SRI Publication 
 Radiation Processing Technology Applications: Volume II, An SRI Publication

References

 http://upgovernor.gov.in/upgovernor.gov.in/listvc.htm
 http://www.uptu.ac.in/governance/vc_profile.htm

External links

 R.K. Khandal Biography, EngineeringWatch, 2013.
 http://tennews.in/uptu-best-technical-university-says-dr-r-k-khandal-vc/
 http://tennews.in/uptu-vc-dr-r-k-khandal-showers-praise-on-progressive-management-of-its-group-of-education/
 http://tennews.in/uptu-vc-dr-r-k-khandal-address-faculty-fdp-eng-college/
 http://ww.itimes.com/video/prof-dr-rk-khandal-vice-chancellor-gbtu-lucknow-srijan-2013-part-1

People from Alwar district
People from Lucknow district
1957 births
Living people
Indian Institute of Technology (Indian School of Mines), Dhanbad alumni